Turridrupa diffusa is a species of sea snail, a marine gastropod mollusk in the family Turridae, the turrids.

Description
The length of the shell differs between 12 mm and 17.5 mm. The sinus apex is situated at the end of the peripheral cord, which contains unicolored dashes defined by blotches.

Distribution
This marine species occurs off the Marshall Islands, Samoa and New Caledonia.

References

.

External links
 Tardy, E. & Stahlschmidt, P. (2022). Shallow water turrids of Ile des Pins, New Caledonia (Mollusca, Gastropoda). Revue Suisse de Zoologie. 129(1): 167-219

diffusa
Gastropods described in 1967